Voyage of the Scarlet Queen was a radio drama portraying the adventures of the 78-foot ketch Scarlet Queen in the South Pacific. It was broadcast on Mutual from 3 July 1947 to 14 February 1948.

Personnel
James Burton produced the scripts by Gil Doud and Robert Tallman. Elliott Lewis starred as Philip Karney, master of the Scarlet Queen, with Ed Max as first mate Red Gallagher.
Other voice actors include: Gloria Blondell, Lillian Buyeff, William Conrad, John Dehner, Verna Felton, Paul Frees, Frank Gerstle, Virginia Gregg, Ira Grossel, William Johnstone, Berry Kroeger, Jack Kruschen, Mary Lansing, Cathy Lewis, Roddy McDowall, Alan Reed, Rolfe Sedan, Charles Seel, Eric Snowden, Ben Wright, and Barton Yarborough.
Sound effects were provided by Ray Kemper, Tom Hanley, Bill James, considered among the best in the business.
Music was composed and conducted by Richard Aurandt.

Scenario
Each episode opens with an entry from the ship's log, such as: "Log entry, the ketch Scarlet Queen, Philip Karney, master. Position – three degrees, seven minutes north, 104 degrees, two minutes east. Wind, fresh to moderate; sky, fair..." with a similar closing: "Ship secured for the night. Signed, Philip Karney, master." Arriving at an exotic port of call, the captain and first mate would go ashore and immediately run into trouble with local authorities, agents of rival merchants, or desperate women in need of rescue. After some investigation and at least one good fight they would solve the problem, get back on the ship and sail away, Karney and Gallagher sharing a laugh and a drink at the wheel before the captain's closing log entry.

Principal characters
 Ship's Master Captain Philip Karney is a principled man of action who places mission above personal gain.
 First Officer Red Gallagher is a skilled bo'sun and a loyal sidekick to Karney, although the loyalty is suspect for the first few episodes.
 Ku Chei Kang, Karney's employer and the financier of the voyage of the Scarlet Queen, appears in only one episode, but figures prominently in episodes 1–21. Kang is the owner of the sprawling international "China Traders, Kang and Sons", offices of which are visited numerous times by Karney in those episodes.
 Constantino, a Portuguese crime lord or similar stature villain, is Kang's antagonist and the source of many (but by no means all) of the troubles that befall Karney and the Scarlet Queen. Constantino's many agents appear in the first 20 episodes, but Constantino himself does not appear until episode 21.
 Ah Sin is a remarkably obese, delicate, vain, educated and ruthless Chinese trader who speaks "like Charles Laughton" and surrounds himself with clouds of jasmine perfume. He appears in three episodes. Ah Sin has a sidekick, a Texan named Mangan who carried a pearl-handled frontier pistol. (Ah Sin was the name of an unrelated character in a Bret Harte poem and later a play by Harte and Mark Twain that attempted to expose American racist attitudes toward immigrant Chinese laborers in California. See The Heathen Chinee.)
 Henrietta "Hank" Ainley is a love interest of Karney who appears in two episodes. She is acted by Cathy Lewis, real-life wife of Captain Karney actor Elliott Lewis.
 Neilson is the crew member who is mentioned most by name and the only one with any speaking lines. He is voiced by Frank Driscoll in Episode 4 and by William Conrad in episode 20. Other crew members mentioned in the action include Cronin, Gordon, and Kohler.

Changes from the pilot to the series
The pilot starred Howard Duff as Captain Phil Karney, and Elliott Lewis as First Officer Red Gallagher. For the series, Lewis took the role of Karney and Ed Max was brought on to play Gallagher.
The pilot show mentions the ultimate villain as Van Gort; this becomes Constantino in the series. Other than a few edits to tighten up the script, The Death of David Malone (the pilot) is as effective as The Shanghai Secret (the first episode of the series) as an introduction to the drama.

Dramatic basis and story arc
Episodes 1–20 chronicle the voyage from San Francisco through many meticulously detailed ports of call until they reach episode 20, "Kang's Treasure and the Ghost of Tangolan Bay". During this time Karney and Gallagher visit ports of call for resupply and further instructions from Kang, provided through local agents of Kang's sprawling Pacific trading operation. At nearly every step they are opposed by agents of Constantino. The "$10 million" prize is a set of ancient Chinese artifacts from every major period of Chinese history. Kang feels the artifacts will restore much needed pride to the people of devastated postwar China, while Constantino is simply greedy and knows that Kang will pay dearly for the artifacts. This climaxes at episode 21.

After Episode 21, Karney, Gallagher, and the Scarlet Queen have another dozen or so adventures, but the series seems to run out of steam without the Kang–Constantino rivalry and the continuity of the original story.

The Scarlet Queen and the Starship Enterprise
The structure of the adventures, opening with a quote from the Ship's Log that introduces a sense of mystery of what is to come, and finishing with a final "captain's log" entry, with adventure in between, has been suggested as a forerunner to the much later Star Trek. The opportunities for inspiration are myriad, but they do not prove causation.

Spelling of the captain's name
Many old-time radio websites exist with reviews of the show and downloads of episodes. Captain Phil Karney's name is spelled variously as Carney, Karney, and Kearney. An image of a Billboard magazine review of the show from August 1947 uses Kearney. However, the original scripts for "The Barefoot Nymph in the Mother Hubbard Jacket" and "The Ninth Niece in the Street of Weeping Women" use Karney. These scripts are in the UCLA library special collections Mort Fine collection boxes 51 and 52.

Individual episodes
Voyage of the Scarlet Queen – Complete Log
Fictitious locations are in quotes. Modern Google Maps place names are in parentheses.

Assessment
Technically the show was among the better radio productions of the time, employing realistic sound effects and sailing terminology, well paced stories and colorfully detailed settings. Most places visited by the Queen are real. Even the map coordinates given by the captain are mostly accurate, following a zigzag course around the South Pacific.

Follow-ups
After the show was cancelled, an attempt was made to revive it under a different name.  Only the audition show was produced which was not picked up.  The new show's title was to be The Log Of The Black Parrot.  The cast included Ed Max, Ted Osborne, Lillian Buyeff, Harold Hughes, Jack Kruschen, and Ben Wright.  Music was directed by Walter Schumann and composed by Nathan Scott.  The audition was produced by the star of Scarlet Queen, Elliot Lewis and directed by Gil Doud.  The announcer was Bob Stevenson.  It was recorded on May 6, 1950.

A TV pilot was made in 1975 loosely based on the same concept, titled The Log of the Black Pearl, which likewise included Jack Kruschen in the cast, co-starring with Ralph Bellamy and Kiel Martin, with Jack Webb as executive producer.

References

External links
OTR Network Library: Voyage of the Scarlet Queen (33 episodes)
Internet Archive: Voyage of the Scarlet Queen (32 episodes, mp3 format)

American radio dramas
1940s American radio programs
Mutual Broadcasting System programs